9-cis-beta-carotene 9',10'-cleaving dioxygenase (CCD7 (gene), MAX3 (gene), NCED7 (gene)) is an enzyme with systematic name 9-cis-beta-carotene:O2 oxidoreductase (9',10'-cleaving). This enzyme catalyses the following chemical reaction

 9-cis-beta-carotene + O2  9-cis-10'-apo-beta-carotenal + beta-ionone

9-cis-beta-carotene 9',10'-cleaving dioxygenase contains Fe2+.

References

External links 
 

EC 1.13.11